Patriarch Jacob may refer to:

 Patriarch Jacob of Alexandria
 Patriarch Jacob I, Maronite Patriarch of Antioch in 1141–1151
 Patriarch Jacob II, Maronite Patriarch of Antioch in 1277–1278
 Patriarch Jacob III, Maronite Patriarch of Antioch in 1445–1468
 Patriarch Jacob IV, Maronite Patriarch of Antioch in 1705–1733